Francisco Maria Supico (1 November 1830 - 20 August 1911) was a Portuguese journalist, freemason and politician.

References 

1830 births
1911 deaths
Portuguese journalists
Male journalists
19th-century Portuguese politicians